The National Council of States is an organ of the Nigerian Government. Its functions include advising the executive on policy making. The Council has no executive power, however plays an important advice and consent role in government operations.

History 
In the First Nigerian Republic, there was no National Council of State as the Premiers occasionally they met with the Prime Minister of Nigeria, Sir Abubakar Tafawa Balewa. The idea of the National Council of State was first introduced by General Murtala Muhammed on 30 July 1975 in a broadcast to the nation after deposing General Yakubu Gowon:

He then appointed the following governors as members of the council of state:

 Muhammed Buhari (North-East)
 George Innih (Mid-West)
 Sani Bello (Kano)
 Adekunle Lawal
 Paul Omu (South-East)
 Ibrahim Taiwo (Kwara)
 Akintunde Aduwo (West)
 Anthony Ochefu (East-Central)
 Usman Jubrin (North-Central)
 Abdullahi Mohammed (Benue-Plateau)
 Umaru Mohammed (North-West) 
 Zamani Lekewot (Rivers).

The 1979 constitution enlarged the composition of the Council of State to its current size.

Composition of the Council of State
The Council of State consists of the following persons:
 
President, who is the Chairman
Vice-President, who is the Deputy Chairman
All former Presidents of the Federation and all former Heads of the Government of the Federation
All former Chief Justices of Nigeria
President of the Senate 
Speaker of the House of Representatives 
All the Governors of the states of the Federation
Minister of Justice and Attorney General of the Federation

Duties
The council has responsibilities in advising the President in the exercise of his/her powers with respect to the following: national population census and compilation, publication and keeping of records, prerogative of mercy, awarding of national honours, the appointment of members of the Independent National Electoral Commission, the appointment of members of the National Judicial Council (other than ex-officio members of that Council), and the appointment of members of the National Population Commission.

It also advises the President whenever requested to do so on the maintenance of public order within the Federation or any part thereof and on such other matters as the President may direct. It has acted during the COVID-19 pandemic in Nigeria as well as during times of economic crisis.

See also 

 National Economic Council (Nigeria)
 National Security Council (Nigeria)
 National Defence Council (Nigeria)
 Nigeria Police Council
 State Council of Traditional Rulers and Chiefs

References 

 1999 Constitution of Nigeria

Government of Nigeria
Politics of Nigeria